Joseph Azar (born 1942) is a Lebanese artist, solo singer, and renowned performer in Lebanese musical comedies and theatre.

Beginnings
Azar was born in the town of Jezzine, Lebanon. He was the youngest of four sons and attended elementary school in his hometown.  He began singing at a very young age, influenced by his father and was characterized by his strong traditional voice, which he developed as a Psalmist in a church choir. At the end of 1958, Azar moved to Beirut where he received musical courses at the National Conservatory, which was run by renowned lute player Farid Ghosn.

Career
Joseph Azar began his career in 1961 with the Rahbani Brothers and Fairuz in the play Al Baal-bakiye then repeated the experiment in several plays, including: Jisir El Amar (1962), Hollo (1963) and he played the role of Rajeh in the musical play Bayaa El Khawatem. He was assigned the starring role next to the star Sabah in the musical El Challal directed by Romeo Lahoud and composed by Walid Gholmieh. In the years 1965, 1966 and 1967, Joseph Azar played the main role in three consecutive works with Sabah and Nadia Jamal which were entitled: Mawwal, Mijjana and Attaba composed by Zaki Nassif, Walid Gholmieh and Romeo Lahhoud.

He played the role of  the Prince Badr in the play El Qalaa (1968) with Sabah. It was composed by Walid Gholmieh and directed by Romeo Lahoud. In 1971, Joseph Azar played the role of the Russian ambassador in the play Phoenicia 80 and in the summer same year, he starred in the Byblos International Festival with the Anwar troupe (Ferkat al Anwar), in the play Ya Leil in conjunction with Duraid Lahham, Fadwa Obeid and Nadia Jamal. The poems were written by George Jerdaq and the music was composed by Walid Gholmieh and the play directed by Munir Mouasseri. In 1999, he collaborated with Caracalla dance group in the plays Laylat Qamar and Alf Layle w Layle that were played at the Baalbeck International Festival. The play Alf Layle w Layle was played in 2002 on the major international theaters including the Place des Arts in Montreal, Canada, Opera House in Frankfurt, Germany and the National Theatre in Beijing under the auspices of the Chinese Ministry of Culture.

References

1942 births
Lebanese actors
20th-century Lebanese male singers
Living people